Edward Oramael Austin, (December 28, 1825 – August 1, 1909) was a settler and founder of Austin, Pennsylvania, USA.

Edward Oramael Austin was born on December 28, 1825  in Greene, New York. He traveled to Whites Corners, Potter County, Pennsylvania in 1841 along with his parents.  He stayed there until 1856, when he settled in Freeman Run, Potter County, Pennsylvania.

Austin lived in a small cabin he built which is now Main Street in Austin. In 1878 he built a larger home. There now stands a replica of Austin's home very close to where it originally stood. It houses a museum dedicated to him, the Austin Dam, the flood of 1911, and the overall history of the town. The original home was destroyed by the 1911 flood. He was a surveyor by trade. Also, he was a Justice of the Peace his entire life.

Later, in 1870, he built a state road from Austin to Keating Summit, to give a railroad connection to Austin. The clearing of his tract of land in Austin ultimately led to great manufacturing interests, and industrial development. Therefore, he was able to bring in the business of Goodyear and Mr. Garretson. 
The borough of Austin was named after him and it was officially incorporated in October 1888. He actually owned the 147 acres on which the town was built. Because of his skills as a civil engineer and land surveyor he was able to draw plans to lay out the town as he saw fit.

From 1847 to 1849, Austin spent time studying law, although he had no intention of practicing. He also did some writing about Potter County which was incorporated in Egle's History of Pennsylvania. He was a Justice of the Peace for 55 years. He was a school director for 40 years. Austin was elected County Commissioner in 1863 and served two terms. He served in the Civil War from late 1862 until July 1865. He was a member of the Masons at the level of Master Mason.

Family
He was first married on March 15, 1849 to Amelia Steadman. Together they had five children. Following the death of his wife in March 1875 he married Julia Allington Wales. Together they had three children. She died May 3, 1906 at the family home in Austin.

Children of Edward and Amelia Austin:
 Charles Douglas Austin, born 28 September 1849, died 2 June 1933.
 Frank Purple Austin, born 1 June 1852, died 7 January 1891.
 Ralph Steadman Austin, born 9 April 1858, died 27 February 1929.
 Harry Edward Austin, born 25 February 1862, died 28 October 1887.
 Sarah Emma Austin, born 27 November 1864, died 8 October 1941.

Children of Edward and Julia Austin:
 Jonathan Fredrick Austin, born 10 April 1876, died 11 September 1949.
 Agnes Mary Austin, born 3 June 1878, died 20 November 1931.
 Thomas Duel Austin, born 28 August 1881.

Edward Oramael Austin died at his home on 1 August 1909.

References

American pioneers
People from Potter County, Pennsylvania
1825 births
1909 deaths
People from Greene, New York